Slavné historky zbojnické (Famous Bandit Stories) is a Czechoslovak adventure historical television series filmed in 1985. 6 episodes, each 59 minutes long, were filmed. The series was directed by Hynek Bočan.

Every episode tells a story of famous bandit. It shows harsh reaity of bandit life. Every episodde started with narrator introducing main character's personality to audience.

Cast
Miloš Kopecký (narrator)
Radoslav Brzobohatý as Václav Babinský (episode 1)
Jana Hlaváčová as Charita (episode 1)
Jiří Bartoška as Šobri Jožka (episode 2)
Karel Heřmánek as Count Lužanský (episode 2)
Ivan Vyskočil as Jan Jiří Grasel (episode 3)
Jaromír Hanzlík as David Majer (episode 3)
Miroslav Vladyka as Schinderhannes (episode 4)
Pavel Zedníček as Róža Šándor (episode 5)
Vladimír Dlouhý as Jean Ferey  (episode 6)

Episodes
The names of the episodes are also the names of the main characters, that is, robbers and robbers. The actor who portrayed the main character is listed in parentheses.

 Václav Babinský, premiered on 18 October 1986
 Šobri Jožka, premiere on 19 July 1986
 Jan Jiří Grasel, premiered on 17 October 1987
 Schinderhannes, premiered on 9 July 1988
 Róža Šándor, premiered on 18 June 1988
 Trestanec Salvador, premiered on 8 March 1986

The listed order has only stabilized since the replay in 1997.

External links
Website (in Czech)
IMDb.com

References 

Czech anthology television series
Czech adventure television series
Czech historical television series
Czechoslovak television series
1986 television series debuts
1988 television series endings
Czechoslovak Television original programming